The Oklahoma Kid is a 1929 American silent Western film directed by J. P. McGowan and starring Bob Custer, Vivian Bay and Henry Roquemore. It was produced as a second feature for release by the independent Poverty Row company Syndicate Film Exchange.

Synopsis
The Kid is sent from Oklahoma to New Mexico to collect a consignment of cattle, where he counters a gang of outlaws.

Cast
 Bob Custer as Bob, the Oklahoma Kid
 Vivian Bay as Grace Standing
 J. P. McGowan as Gang Leader Petty
 Tom Bay as Pete Gibbs 
 Henry Roquemore as Mr Standing
 Walter Patterson as Henchman

References

Bibliography
 Pitts, Michael R. Poverty Row Studios, 1929–1940. McFarland & Company, 2005.

External links
 
 
 
 

1929 films
1929 Western (genre) films
American silent feature films
Silent American Western (genre) films
American black-and-white films
1920s English-language films
Films directed by J. P. McGowan
Films set in New Mexico
1920s American films